Morghak-e Yek (also Romanized as Morghaḵ-e Yek) is a village in Ramjin Rural District, Chaharbagh District, Savojbolagh County, Alborz Province, Iran. At the 2006 census, its population was 70, in 25 families.

References 

Populated places in Savojbolagh County